Geir Hartly Andreassen, FSF (born 22 November 1971) is a Norwegian cinematographer based in Stockholm, Sweden. His work includes The Mortal Instruments: City of Bones (2013), Kon Tiki (2012), Max Manus (2008), Lange Flate Ballær I and II (2006, 2008), and Darling (2007).

Andreassen has won several awards, including the Amanda Award (2009) for best cinematography for Max Manus, Guldbagge Award in (2007) for best cinematography for Darling.

Filmography

Features
The Mortal Instruments: City of Bones (2013)
Kon-Tiki (2012)
Max Manus (2008)
Lange Flate Ballær 2 (2008)
Majken (2008)
Darling (2007)
Babas bilar (2006)
Lange flate ballær (2006)
Boban hockeystjärnan (2003)
Cuba libre (2002)
Barnsäng (2001)
Nöd ut (1996)

Shorts

 Innesluten (Fredrik Edfeldt) Pinguinfilm, 2004
 Boban Hockeystjärnan (Miko Lazic) Filmkreatörerna, 2003
 Cuba Libre (Kristina Humle) Filmbolaget, 2002
 Barnsäng (Fredrik Edfeldt) Pinguinfilm, 2001
 Unce Upon a Time (Miko Lazic) Filmkreatörerna, 2000
 Fly (Matias A. Jordal) Paradox, 2000 (Winner of Norway shortfilm festival)
 Nöd Ut (Geir Hansteen Jörgensen), 1996
 Monument (Kristin Seim Buflod), 1996

Documentary

 Einstein (Karin Wegsiö), 2004. Commissioned by the Nobel Museum in Stockholm

Education 

 Bachelor of arts, Cinematography, University College of Film (Dramatiska Institutet). Professor: Sven Nykvist, ASC, FSF
 Technician of Telecommunication, Technical school (Stavanger Tekniske Fagskole)

Memberships 
 The Swedish Society of Cinematographers (FSF)

Awards 
Amanda Award (2009) Best cinematography for Max Manus.
Guldbagge Award (2007) Best cinematography for Darling.
 George Eastman Award (2007)
 Dolby Laboratories Sound Award for the film A modest psychological blowout, 1992
 Amandus for best short film Verdens herlighet, 1989

See also 

Max Manus
Lange Flate Ballær

References

External links 

ghfilm.com – Official Site

1971 births
Norwegian cinematographers
Living people
Best Cinematographer Guldbagge Award winners